How Ya Lookin' Southbound? Come In... is a limited edition tour EP by the musician Ben Kweller. It was released in 2008 to promote the Pre-Horses Club Tour which began September 25 in Dallas, Texas. The EP contains 3 songs from the upcoming 2009 album, Changing Horses, as well as unreleased demos and material taken from Ben's personal recordings.

Track listing
 "Fight"
 "Things I Like to Do"
 "Sawdust Baby"
 "Sawdust Man"
 "The Biggest Flower"
 "F Train Blues / Gypsy Rosita"
 "Somehow (Singlemalt Version)"

Ben Kweller albums
2008 EPs